McKain is a surname. Notable people with the surname include:

Archie McKain (1911–1985), American baseball player
Devante McKain (born 1994), English footballer
Douglas Mary McKain (1789–1873), New Zealand nurse, midwife and businesswoman
Hal McKain (1906–1970), American baseball player
Jonathan McKain (born 1982), Australian footballer